Abdul Malek is a Jatiya Party (Ershad) politician and the former member of parliament for Manikganj-3. He was a former colonel of the Bangladesh Army and a former mayor of Dhaka.

Career
Malek was elected to parliament from Manikganj-3 as a Jatiya Party candidate in 1986 and 1988. From 20 October 1986 to 9 November 1989, he served as the mayor/administer of Dhaka City Corporation. He was appointed to the position by President Hussain Mohammad Ershad.

Personal life 
Malek's son Zahid Maleque is the Minister for Health and Family Planning.

Legacy 
Colonel Malek Medical College was named after him.

References

Jatiya Party politicians
2000 deaths
3rd Jatiya Sangsad members
4th Jatiya Sangsad members
Year of birth missing
Bangladesh Army colonels
Mayors of Dhaka